Highway 289 (AR 289, Ark. 289, and Hwy. 289) is a designation for two north–south state highways in north central Arkansas. A southern route of  runs north from Highway 69B (AR 69B) at Sage to Zion. A second route of  begins at Highway 56 in Franklin and runs north to Highway 9 in Mammoth Spring.

Route description

Sage to Zion
The route runs north to the Caney Springs Cumberland Presbyterian Church, which is listed on the National Register of Historic Places (NRHP). Highway 289 continues northeast to Zion, where state maintenance ends and the road continues north under county maintenance.

Mammoth Spring to Franklin
Highway 289 begins in the northeastern corner of Izard County at Highway 56 in Franklin. The route runs north to a junction with AR 354 in Horseshoe Bend. The route continues north into Fulton County to Glencoe where it begins a concurrency with US Route 62/US Route 412 (US 62/US 412). Highway 289 has a junction with Highway 175 in the western part of the city before exiting the city limits and continuing north to Saddle. The highways passes the Saddle Store, a two-story general store built in 1916 and listed on the NRHP on its way north through the county. Highway 289 crosses over English Creek on a historic 1929 Pratt through truss bridge built by Virginia Bridge & Iron Company, also NRHP-listed, heading north as well. Shortly after entering Mammoth Spring, the highway terminates at Highway 9 near the Missouri state line.

Major intersections

See also

References

289
Transportation in Fulton County, Arkansas
Transportation in Izard County, Arkansas